Vesconte Point is a steep rock point on the south side of Bermel Peninsula, Bowman Coast, marking the extremity of a spur running southeast from the easternmost of the Bowditch Crests. The point was first roughly mapped by W.L.G. Joerg from air photos taken by Lincoln Ellsworth on November 23, 1935, and was later surveyed by the Falkland Islands Dependencies Survey (FIDS) in December 1958. In association with the names of pioneers of navigation grouped in this area, it was named by the United Kingdom Antarctic Place-Names Committee (UK-APC) after Petrus Vesconte of Genoa, the earliest known chartmaker whose charts survive (the first dated 1311).

Headlands of Graham Land
Bowman Coast